Kurt Vespermann (1 May 1887 – 13 July 1957) was a German stage and film actor.

Career 
Vespermann was born into an actor's family in Culmsee, West Prussia, Imperial Germany today Chełmża, Poland. Already his great-grandparents were actors and directors at different operas and theatres. Vespermann began his career in 1913 at the Royal Schauspielhaus Berlin and first appeared in silent movies in 1915.

Kurt Vespermann was married to actress Lia Eibenschütz and was the father of actor Gerd Vespermann.

Vespermann died in 1957 and was buried at the Kaiser-Wilhelm-Gedächtnis cemetery in Berlin.

Selected filmography

1915: Manya, die Türkin
1915: Im Feuer der Schiffskanonen
1915: Police Nr. 1111 - Baron von Bode
1916: Ein tolles Mädchen
1916: Stolz weht die Flagge schwarz-weiß-rot
1917: Das durfte nicht kommen
1917: Let There Be Light (part 1, 4) - Gerd
1917: Königliche Bettler
1917: Der Tod des Baumeisters Olsen (Short)
1917: Das Siegel
1918: His Majesty the Hypochondriac
1918: Die Sühne - Ludwig
1918: Put to the Test
1918: The Ringwall Family - Argad, Magdalenas Brunder
1918: Frauchen in Nöten
1918: Amalie - 45 Mark
1918: Ehemann a. D.
1918: Weil ich dich liebe
1918: Und hätte der Liebe nicht
1918: Der Antiquar von Straßburg - Victor Häsli, Bruder
1918: Bubi, der Tausendsassa (Short)
1918: Arme kleine Helga
1919: Die Siebzehnjährigen - Sohn Frieder Schlettow
1920: Das Große Licht - Fritz Rasmussen
1920: Der Todfeind - Krüppel
1920: The Skull of Pharaoh's Daughter - Tirhaka
1920: Schiffe und Menschen - Georg Hellmann
1920: Florentinische Nächte
1921: Planetenschieber
1921: Burning Country - Karl
1921: The Shadow of Gaby Leed
1921: Der Gang durch die Hölle - Bob
1921: Kean
1921: Die Hexe
1922: Black Monday
1922: She and the Three - Der Dichter
1923: Felicitas Grolandin
1923: The Little Napoleon - Florian Wunderlich
1923: The Buddenbrooks - Renee Throta
1923: Tragedy of Love - Staatsanwalt-Substitut
1923: The Countess of Paris - Oberstaatsanwalt
1923: The Great Industrialist
1924: Maud Rockefeller's Bet - Bill Wellwood
1924: The Little Duke - Leutnant Alexander
1925: Athletes - Fridolin Stumper
1925: Passion - Rudi Anthofer
1925: Den of Iniquity - Gustav
1925: The Great Opportunity
1925: The Woman without Money
1925: A Woman for 24 Hours - Emil Springer
1926: The Pride of the Company - Musketier Franz
1926: Die Tugendprobe. Eine lustige Begebenheit von der Waterkant
1926: Accommodations for Marriage
1926: People to Each Other - Fritz
1926: The Third Squadron - Der Einjährig-Freiwilliger
1926: Herbstmanöver
1926: The Man in the Fire - Karl Winter
1926: The Young Man from the Ragtrade
1926: Unmarried Daughters - Stichelmann - ein Maler
1927: Der Kavalier vom Wedding
1927: The Pink Slippers - Adjutant
1927: Babette Bomberling - Kippenbach jr.
1927: How Do I Marry the Boss?
1927: Männer vor der Ehe - Der arme Junggeselle
1927: The Prisoners of Shanghai - Teddy Knickerbocker, Berichterstatter
1927: The Director General - Reinhold Gehrke
1927: The Indiscreet Woman - Herr Leon
1927: The Beggar Student - Der Kornett
1927: Elternlos
1927: Die 3 Niemandskinder - Hendrik van Vriis
1927: Der Fahnenträger von Sedan
1928: The Beloved of His Highness - Achsel
1928: Marys großes Geheimnis
1928: The Lady in Black - Carl Toll, Redakteur
1928: Yacht of the Seven Sins - Alfons Costa
1928: Die Königin seines Herzens - Graf Wetterstein, Adjutant
1928: Mädchenschicksale - Architekt Drews
1928: Eva in Silk - Fritz Jacobsthal, Manager
1928: Ein Tag Film (Short) - Ehemann
1928: Das Spiel mit der Liebe - Günther Hilpert
1928: Sixteen Daughters and No Father
1928: The Weekend Bride - Fritz Bornemann
1928: A Girl with Temperament - Bela Körtecz
1928: Der Faschingsprinz
1929: Asphalt
1929: What a Woman Dreams of in Springtime - Max Müller, Bücherreisender
1929: Mascots - Bruno, Musician
1929: The Flight from Love - Henry von Nostitz, Attaché
1929: The Favourite of Schonbrunn - Trencks Diener
1929: Land Without Women - Joe Smith, "Hastings" steward
1929: Trust der Diebe - Einbrecher
1930: Alimente - Willi Alt
1930: Rooms to Let - Dr. Hans Weber
1930: O Mädchen, mein Mädchen, wie lieb' ich Dich!
1930: Pension Schöller - Ernst Kissling
1931: Every Woman Has Something - Charles Dangerfield, Bruder
1931: Ich heirate meinen Mann - Bob Walter
1931: Terror of the Garrison - Leutnant Schmidt
1931: Der Verjüngte Adolar - Hans Frohammer, Friedels Verlobter
1931: Without Meyer, No Celebration is Complete - Elsa's Fiancé
1931: Children of Fortune
1931: Ronny - Bahnhofsvorsteher Bomboni
1931: The Unknown Guest - Harry Müller
1932: Der schönste Mann im Staate - Dr.Hans Winter, Leutnant der Reserve
1932: Vater geht auf Reisen - Fritz Osten
1932: Scandal on Park Street
1932: Aus einer kleinen Residenz - Oberleutnant Müller
1932: A Shot at Dawn - Bobby
1932: The Beautiful Adventure - Herr Desmigneres
1932: How Shall I Tell My Husband? - Diener Johann
1932: Thea Roland - Merkel - Journalist
1932: Contest - Steppke, Wenck's mechanic
1932: When Love Sets the Fashion - Pierre
1933: The House of Dora Green - Thomas
1933: Die Unschuld vom Lande - Paul, sein Diener
1933: The Sandwich Girl - Harry Knoll
1933: Happy Days in Aranjuez - Fred
1933: Ist mein Mann nicht fabelhaft? - Friedrich Zirbelschuh
1933: Zwei im Sonnenschein - Winkler, Zauberkünstler
1933: 
1933: Hugos Nachtarbeit (Short) - Hugo Hartmann
1933: Der streitbare Herr Kickel (Short) - Herr Müller
1933: Das 13. Weltwunder (Short)
1934: The Voice of Love - Seppl, Ekhardt Diener
1934: Konjunkturritter - Dr. Günther, Rechtsanwalt
1934: The World Without a Mask - Dr. Tobias Bern
1934: You Are Adorable, Rosmarie - Tom Chester
1934: A Woman Who Knows What She Wants - Peter Kasten
1934: The Legacy of Pretoria - Hans Joachim Förster
1934: Lottchens Geburtstag (Short)
1934: Ein Heiratsantrag (Short) - Nepomuk Buschmann, der Gutsnachbar
1934: Die Rosarote Brille (Short)
1934: Bums, der Scheidungsgrund (Short)
1935: She and the Three - Toni Kemser, Chauffeur
1935: The Red Rider - Leutnant Biegl
1935: Wenn ein Mädel Hochzeit macht - Steffen, Gastwirt
1935: Der Taler der Tante Sidonie (Short) - Vater
1935: Wer wagt - gewinnt - Der Chauffeur des 100 PS
1935: The Blonde Carmen - Der Regisseur
1935: Buchhalter Schnabel - Bob Götz
1935: Forget Me Not - Ernst Mülmann - Curtis Impresario
1935: Der Mann mit der Pranke - Richard Möllenhof
1935: Unter vier Augen (Short)
1936: Michel Strogoff - Alcide Jolivet, French journalist
1936: Paul and Pauline - Heinrich Zehnpfennig, Friseur
1936: Engel mit kleinen Fehlern - Manager
1936:  Orders Are Orders - Hibberlich - Verkäufer
1936: Der Verkannte Lebemann - Dr.Otto Seebach - Theaterdirektor
1936: Männer vor der Ehe - Paul Lange - Radiotechniker
1936: Geheimnis eines alten Hauses - Alfred Timm
1936: Der Lustige Witwenball
1937: Wenn du eine Schwiegermutter hast - Erich Rückert - Inhaber Modesalon 'Mascotte'
1938: Das Mädchen mit dem guten Ruf - Olivieri
1938: Peter spielt mit dem Feuer
1939: Parkstrasse 13 - Mieke
1939: Morgen werde ich verhaftet - Jack I. Brown
1939: Der Arme Millionär - Sekretär Siebecke
1939: The Life and Loves of Tschaikovsky - Ferdyschtschenko
1940: Polterabend - Klaus
1940: Beates Flitterwoche - Heinz Kuppelweger
1941: Der scheinheilige Florian - Emil Krüger, Versicherungsagent
1941: Am Abend auf der Heide - Aufnahmeleiter Knoll
1941: The Gasman - Staatsanwalt
1942: Die Nacht in Venedig - Nicolo, Italienischer Theaterdirektor
1943: Gefährlicher Frühling - Peter Gornemann
1944: The Buchholz Family - Dr. Julius Stinde
1944: Marriage of Affection - Dr. Julius Stinde
1944: Jan und die Schwindlerin
1945: Shiva und die Galgenblume - (unfinished film)
1946: Tell the Truth
1947: Jan und die Schwindlerin - Ewald Bastler
1949: Martina
1951: Unschuld in tausend Nöten - Meyer
1951: Not Without Gisela - Prokurist Braun
1951: Dark Eyes - Zeidler
1952: A Very Big Child - Vater Kilian
1952: The Prince of Pappenheim - Bürgermeister
1953: The Rose of Stamboul - Standesbeamter
1953: The Empress of China - Herr Lose
1953: Father Is Being Stupid - Kaminski
1953: His Royal Highness - Finanzminister Krippenreuther
1954: Girl with a Future - Emil Duske
1954: The Seven Dresses of Katrin - Onkel Philipp Hensel
1954: König Drosselbart - Oberhofmeister
1954: Bon Voyage
1954: Der Briefträger ging vorbei (TV Movie) - Michel Rocheguse
1955: Doctor Solm
1955: The Ambassador's Wife - Nilsson
1955: Request Concert - Steinberg
1955: Ripening Youth - Oberstudienrat Dr. Türck
1955: My Leopold - Zernikow
1955: Son Without a Home - Maurer Menzel
1955: Your Life Guards - Professor
1956: Before Sundown - Wuttke, Fahrer bei Clausen
1956: Like Once Lili Marleen - Portier Krause
1956: Melody of the Heath - Brettschneider
1956: As Long as the Roses Bloom - Diener
1957: Jede Nacht in einem anderen Bett
1957: Victor and Victoria - Intendant
1957: Different from You and Me - Dr. Schmidt

References

Notes
 Vor der Kamera. Fünfzig Schauspieler in Babelsberg, herausgegeben von Ralf Schenk. Henschel Verlag Berlin 1995.

Sources

External links
 
 pictures of Kurt Vespermann

1887 births
1957 deaths
People from Chełmża
German male film actors
German male silent film actors
German male stage actors
People from West Prussia
20th-century German male actors